Sirkus Eliassen is a Norwegian band consisting of brothers Magnus Eliassen and Erik Eliassen. The duo was formed in 2011 releasing its single "Hjem til dæ" that achieved high rotation on Norwegian radio and became a hit on VG-lista, the official Norwegian Singles Chart.

In November 2011 they released their second single «Opp ned bak frem», followed by «Æ vil bare dans» in February 2012 and «Før du går» in June the same year. Sirkus Eliassen's seven singles has achieved 43 x platinum in Norway. All seven singles have been playlisted on national radio in Norway.

Their biggest hit, «Æ vil bare dans», was the most streamed, Norwegian song on both Spotify and WiMP in 2012. The song also achieved the Norwegian Grammy for "Hit of the year 2012" the same year. The duo have performed «Æ vil bare dans» at over ten national TV shows in Norway.

In February 2013, Sirkus Eliassen took part in the Melodi Grand Prix performing the song "I Love You Te Quiero".

Discography

Singles

References

Sibling musical duos
Living people
Musical groups established in 2011
Norwegian musical duos
Musical groups from Bodø
Year of birth missing (living people)
2011 establishments in Norway